Andexanet alfa, sold under the trade name Andexxa among others, is an antidote for the medications rivaroxaban and apixaban, when reversal of anticoagulation is needed due to uncontrolled bleeding. It has not been found to be useful for other factor Xa inhibitors. It is given by injection into a vein.

Common side effects include pneumonia and urinary tract infections. Severe side effects may include blood clots, heart attacks, strokes, or cardiac arrest. It works by binding to rivaroxaban and apixaban.

It was approved for medical use in the United States in May 2018. It was developed by Portola Pharmaceuticals.

Medical uses
Andexanet alfa is used to stop life-threatening or uncontrollable bleeding in people who are taking rivaroxaban or apixaban.

There are no randomised clinical trials as of 2019. Studies in healthy volunteers show that the molecule binds factor Xa inhibitors and counters their anti-Xa-activity. The only published clinical trial is a prospective, open label, single group study. This study reports results on 352 people and demonstrates a reduction of anti-Xa-activity while also showing an excellent or good hemostatic efficacy in 82%. While people who were expected to die in 30 days were excluded from the study, 14% of participants died. There was no relationship between hemostatic efficacy and reduced anti-Xa-activity. The FDA has demanded a randomised clinical trial: the first results are not expected before 2023.

Adverse effects
Common side effects include pneumonia and urinary tract infections. Severe side effects may include blood clots or cardiac arrest.

Andexanet alfa has a boxed warning that it is associated with arterial and venous blood clots, ischemic events, cardiac arrest, and sudden deaths.

Pharmacology

Mechanism of action
Andexanet alfa is a biologic agent, a recombinant modified version of human activated factor X (FXa). Andexanet alfa differs from native FXa due to the removal of a 34 residue fragment that contains the Gla domain. This modification reduces andexanet alfa's procoagulant potential. Additionally, a serine to alanine (S419A) mutation in the active site eliminates its activity as a prothrombin to thrombin catalyst, but still allows the molecule to bind to FXa inhibitors. FXa inhibitors bind to andexanet alfa with the same affinity as to natural FXa. As a consequence in the presence of andexanet alfa natural FXa is partially freed, which can lead to effective hemostasis. In other words, it acts as a decoy receptor. Andexanet alfa reverses effect of all anticoagulants that act directly through FXa or by binding antithrombin III. The drug is not effective against factor IIa inhibitor dabigatran. Its activity is measured using the anti-Xa test, which is utilized to determine the amount of available factor Xa for coagulation

History
It was approved in the United States in 2018 based on data from two phase III studies on reversing the anticoagulant activity of FXa inhibitors rivaroxaban and apixaban in healthy volunteers. As a condition of its accelerated approval there is a study being conducted comparing it to other currently used reversal agents ("usual care").

Society and culture

Economics
Initial pricing (AWP) is $58,000 per reversal (800 mg bolus + 960 mg infusion, $3,300 per 100 mg vial) which is higher than reversal agents for other DOAC agents (idarucizumab for use in dabigatran reversal is $4,200 per reversal).

References

Further reading

External links 
 
 

Antidotes
AstraZeneca brands
Recombinant proteins